The Doha Convention Center Tower is an on-hold  tall skyscraper project which was planned to be constructed in Doha, Qatar. The structure, shaped like a tapering obelisk, would have housed offices on the lower levels, apartments, a hotel and penthouse residences on the upper floors.

Construction was suspended following the discovery that the building would impact flight paths to and from Doha International Airport. Construction was expected to continue when the Hamad International Airport was completed on reclaimed land approximately 3 km to the east of the current airport. The delay meant that the building's completion date was moved from 2012 to an unknown date. The Tower was redesigned with a similar shape similar to the nearby Al Quds Endowment Tower. After the completion of Hamad International Airport, the plans for the supertall skyscraper were scrapped; however, the convention center was successfully built, and opened in 2015.

See also
 List of tallest buildings in Doha, Qatar
 List of buildings with 100 floors or more

References

External links
 
 

Buildings and structures under construction in Qatar
Proposed skyscrapers
Skyscrapers in Doha